Phytoecia icterica is a species of beetle in the family Cerambycidae. It was described by Schaller in 1783, originally under the genus Saperda. It has a wide distribution between Europe and the Middle East. It feeds on Daucus carota sativus, Petroselinum crispum, Pastinaca sativa sativa, Pastinaca sativa, Conium maculatum, and Pimpinella saxifraga.

Subspecies
 Phytoecia icterica icterica (Schaller, 1783)
 Phytoecia icterica annulipes Mulsant, 1863

References

Phytoecia
Beetles described in 1783